John Martin Tchicai (28 April 1936 – 8 October 2012) was a Danish free jazz saxophonist and composer.

Biography
Tchicai was born in Copenhagen, Denmark, to a Danish mother and a Congolese father. The family moved to Aarhus, where he studied violin when young, and in his mid-teens began playing clarinet and alto saxophone, focusing on the latter. By the late 1950s, he was travelling around northern Europe, playing with many musicians.

In 1962, he met trumpeter Bill Dixon and saxophonist Archie Shepp at a festival in Helsinki. At their suggestion, he moved to New York City the following year, and went on to participate in the October Revolution in Jazz and join the New York Contemporary Five and the New York Art Quartet. He also played on a number of influential free jazz recordings, including Shepp's Four for Trane, Albert Ayler's New York Eye and Ear Control, John Coltrane's Ascension, and the Jazz Composer's Orchestra's Communication.

Following his work in New York, Tchicai returned to Denmark in 1966, and shortly thereafter focused most of his time on music education. He formed the small orchestra Cadentia Nova Danica with Danish and other European musicians; this group collaborated with Musica Elettronica Viva and performed in multi-media events. Tchicai was a founding member of Amsterdam's Instant Composers Pool in 1968, and in 1969 took part in the recording of John Lennon and Yoko Ono's Unfinished Music No.2: Life with the Lions.

On 30 August 1975 Tchicai's appearance at the Willisau Jazz Festival was recorded and released later that year as Willi The Pig. On this record, he plays with Swiss pianist Irène Schweizer. Tchicai returned to a regular gigging and recording schedule in the late 1970s. In the early 1980s, he switched to the tenor saxophone as his primary instrument. In 1990, he was awarded a lifetime grant from the Danish Ministry of Culture.

Tchicai and his wife relocated to Davis, California, in 1991, where he led several ensembles. He was awarded a National Endowment for the Arts fellowship in 1997. He was a member of Henry Kaiser and Wadada Leo Smith's "Yo Miles" band, a loose aggregation of musicians exploring Miles Davis's electric period.

Since 2001 he had been living near Perpignan in southern France. On 11 June 2012 he suffered a brain hemorrhage in an airport in Barcelona, Spain. He was recovering and had canceled all appearances when he died in a Perpignan hospital on 8 October 2012, aged 76.

2021 saw the publication of a biography titled "A Chaos with Some Kind of Order", written by Margriet Naber, Tchicai's former wife and collaborator for 20 years, and published by Ear Heart Mind Media. Writer Richard Williams called the book an "intimate and valuable account of (Tchicai's) life and work".

Discography

As leader / co-leader
1968: Cadentia Nova Danica (Polydor) with Karsten Vogel, Hugh Steinmetz, Kim Menzer, Max Brüel, Steffen Andersen, Giorgio Musoni, Yvan Krill, Robidoo
1969: Afrodisiaca (MPS) with Cadentia Nova Danica
1971: Roswell Rudd (America)
1975: Willi The Pig (Willisau) with Irène Schweizer, Buschi Niebergall, Makaya Ntshoko
1977: Darktown Highlights (Storyville) with Simon Spang-Hanssen, Peter Danstrup, Ole Roemer
1977: Real Tchicai (SteepleChase) with Pierre Dørge, Niels-Henning Ørsted Pedersen
1977: Solo (FMP) with Albert Mangelsdorff
1978: Barefoot Dance (Marge) with André Goudbeek
1978: Duets (SVM) with André Goudbeek
1978: John Tchicai & Strange Brothers (FMP) with Peter Danstrup, Ole Rømer, Simon Spang-Hansen
1980: Live In Athens (Praxis) (solo concert)
1981: Continent (Praxis) with Hartmut Geerken
1983: Merlin Vibrations (Plainisphare) with the John Tchicai Orchestra
1985: Cassava Balls (Praxis) with Hartmut Geerken, Don Moye
1987: The African Tapes Volume 1 (Praxis) with Hartmut Geerken, Don Moye
1987: Timo's Message (Black Saint) with Christian Kuntner, Thomas Dürst, Timo Fleig
1987: Put Up The Fight (Storyville)
1988: The African Tapes Volume 2 (Praxis) with Hartmut Geerken, Don Moye
1988: Tchicai / Clinch (Olufsen Records) with Clinch (Christer Irgens-Møller, Peter Friis-Nielsen, Pierre Oliver Jürgens)
1992: Satisfaction (Enja) with Vitold Rek
1993: Grandpa's Spells (Storyville) with Misha Mengelberg
1995: Love Is Touching (B&W) with the Archetypes
1998: Love Notes From The Madhouse (8th Harmonic Breakdown) with Yusef Komunyakaa
1999: Life Overflowing (Nada) with Charlie Kohlhase
2000: John Tchicai's Infinitesimal Flash (Buzz Records) with Francis Wong, Adam Lane, Mat Marucci
2001: Anybody Home? (Tutl)
2001: 2 X 2 (Taso) with Vitold Rek and Karl Berger
2002: On Top of Your Head (Ninth World)
2003: Hope Is Bright Green Up North (CIMP) with Pierre Dørge and Lou Grassi
2003: Dos (CIMP) with Adam Lane
2005: John Tchicai With Strings (Treader)
2005: Big Chief Dreaming (Soul Note) with Garrison Fewell, Massimo Manzi, Tino Tracanna
2005: Hymne til Sofia – Hymn to Sophia (Calibrated) with Kristian Høeg, Ib Bindel, Frederik Magle, Peter Ole Jørgensen, and others
2006: Witch's Scream (TUM) with Andrew Cyrille and Reggie Workman
2006: Good Night Songs (Boxholder) with Charlie Kohlhase and Garrison Fewell
2007: Boiler (Ninth World Music) with Thomas Agergaard, Peter Ole Jørgensen, Sirone
2008: Coltrane In Spring (ILK Music) with Jonas Müller, Nikolas Munch-Hansen, and Kresten Osgood
2008: No Trespassing (Azzurra) with Ice9
2008: One Long Minute (NuBop) with John Tchicai's Five Points
2008: Schlachtfest Session II (Klangbad)
2009: Treader Duos (Treader) with Tony Marsh (one track)
2009: In Monk's Mood (SteepleChase) with George Colligan, Steve LaSpina, Billy Drummond
2009: Look To The Neutrino (Zerozerojazz) with the Lunar Quartet
2010: Truth Lies In-Between (Hôte Marge)
2012: West Africa Tour (Sierra Leone, Liberia & Guinea), April 1985 (Sagittarius A-Star)
2013: Tribal Ghost (NoBusiness)
2015: Clapham Duos (Treader) with Evan Parker
2015: 27 September 2010 (Otoroku) with Tony Marsh and John Edwards
2017: Du Maurier, Vancouver Jazz Festival, 1988 (Condition West) with Vinny Golia, Bill Smith, Clyde Reed, Gregg Simpson
2020: Live at the Stone (Minus Zero)

As sideman
With Albert Ayler
New York Eye and Ear Control (1964, ESP-Disk)

With the Berlin Jazz Workshop Orchestra
Who Is Who? (1979, FMP)

With the Binder Quintet
Binder Quintet Featuring John Tchicai (1983, Krém)

With Willem Breuker and Johan van der Keuken
Music For His Films 1967 / 1994 (1997, BV Haast)

With Brotherhood of Breath
Yes Please (1981, In and Out)

With the Brus Trio
Soaked Sorrows (1988, Dragon)

With Burnin' Red Ivanhoe
M 144 (1969, Sonet)

With Curtis Clark
Letter to South Africa (1987, Nimbus) with Ernst Reijseger, Ernst Glerum, Louis Moholo

With John Coltrane
Ascension (1965, Impulse!)

With Peter Danstrup
Reptiles in the Sky (2010, Gateway)
Beautiful Untrue Things (2012, Gateway)

With Dell – Westergaard – Lillinger
Dell – Westegaard – Lillinger feat. John Tchicai (2012, Jazzwerkstatt)

With Pierre Dørge
Ballad Round the Left Corner (1980, Steeplechase) with Niels-Henning Ørsted Pedersen, Billy Hart
Ball At Louisiana (1983, Steeplechase)
Brikama (1984, Steeplechase) with New Jungle Orchestra
Very Hot, Even The Moon Is Dancing (1985, Steeplechase) with New Jungle Orchestra
Johnny Lives (1987, Steeplechase) with New Jungle Orchestra
Different Places - Different Bananas (1989, Olufsen) with New Jungle Orchestra
Peer Gynt (1989, Olufsen) with New Jungle Orchestra
Live In Chicago (1991, Olufsen) with New Jungle Orchestra
Giraf (1998, Dacapo Records) with New Jungle Orchestra

With Johnny Dyani
Witchdoctor's Son (1978, SteepleChase) with Dudu Pukwana
Angolian Cry (1985, SteepleChase)

With John Ehlis
John Ehlis Ensemble (1996, Sivac)
Along the Way (2012, Sivac)

With The Engines
Other Violets (2013, Not Two)

With Garrison Fewell's Variable Density Sound Orchestra
Evolving Strategies (2012, Not Two)

With Charles Gayle
Always Born (1988, Silkheart)

With George Gruntz
Monster Sticksland Meeting Two – Monster Jazz (1974, MPS / BASF)

With Paul Hemmings
Letter From America (2007, Leading Tone Records)

With The Instant Composers Pool
Instant Composers Pool with Misha Mengelberg and Han Bennink (1968, ICP)
Fragments with Misha Mengelberg, Han Bennink, and Derek Bailey (1978, ICP)
Tetterettet (1977, ICP)

With The Jazz Composer's Orchestra
Communication (1965, Fontana)

With Henry Kaiser and Wadada Leo Smith
Yo Miles! Sky Garden (2003, Cuneiform Records)
Yo Miles! Upriver (2013, Cuneiform Records)

With Adam Lane
Fo(u)r Being(s) (2002, CIMP)

With John Lennon and Yoko Ono
Unfinished Music No. 2: Life with the Lions (1969, Zapple)

With Jorgen Leth
Jazz Jamboree 1962 Vol.4 (2013, Jazzhus Disk) (Leth's name is on the album although he is not a musician and does not play on it.)

With New York Art Quartet
New York Art Quartet (1964, ESP-Disk)
Mohawk (1965, Fontana)
35th Reunion (2000, DIW Records)
Old Stuff (2010, Cuneiform)
Call It Art (2013, Triple Point)

With New York Contemporary Five
Consequences (1963, Fontana)
Rufus (1963, Fontana)
New York Contemporary Five Vol. 1 (1963, Sonet)
New York Contemporary Five Vol. 2 (1963, Sonet)
Bill Dixon 7-tette/Archie Shepp and the New York Contemporary Five (1964, Savoy) One side of LP

With Giancarlo Nicolai
Giancarlo Nicolai Trio & John Tchicai (1987, Leo Records)

With the Open Orchestra
The Spiritual Man (2009, Terre Sommerse)

With Francisco Mondragon Rio
Ancient Civilizations (1997, Pulque) with Karl Berger

With Rent Romus
Adapt... or DIE! (1997, Jazzheads) with Lords of Outland

With Archie Shepp
Four for Trane (1964, Impulse!)

With Katrine Suwalski and Another World
Message of Love (2013, Gateway)

With Cecil Taylor
Winged Serpent (Sliding Quadrants) (1985, Soul Note)

With Triot
Sudden Happiness (2004, TUM)

With Wiebelfetzer
Live (1971, Bazillus)

With Yggdrasil
Den Yderste Ø (1981, Tutl)
Yggdrasil (2002, Tutl) 
Concerto Grotto (1984, Tutl)
Askur (2007, Tutl)

With De Zes Winden (The Six Winds)
Live At The Bim And More (1986, BV Haast)
Elephants Can Dance (1988, Sackville)
Man Met Muts (1990, BV Haast)
Anger Dance (1993, BV Haast)
Manestraal (1997, BV Haast)

References

Gallery

External links
Official Homepage

FMP releases
Official ICE9 with John Tchicai Home Page
Profile at Edition S
  Documentary film about the New York Art Quartet

1936 births
2012 deaths
Avant-garde jazz musicians
Danish jazz musicians
Danish jazz saxophonists
Male saxophonists
Danish people of Democratic Republic of the Congo descent
Jazz alto saxophonists
Danish composers
Male composers
Black Saint/Soul Note artists
Danish expatriates in the United States
Danish expatriates in France
Male jazz musicians
ICP Orchestra members
New York Art Quartet members
New York Contemporary Five members
Storyville Records artists
Ilk Records artists
FMP/Free Music Production artists
Intakt Records artists
NoBusiness Records artists
20th-century saxophonists